Anja Eichhorst (born  1971) is a German backstroke swimmer who won three medals at the European championships in 1989, 1991 and 1992.

After retirement from senior swimming she competed in the masters category and won three world titles in backstroke events in 2000.

References

External links
Photograph

1971 births
Living people
German female swimmers
German female backstroke swimmers
European Aquatics Championships medalists in swimming